Christopher James Magruder (born April 26, 1977) is a former Major League Baseball outfielder who played for the Texas Rangers, Cleveland Indians, and Milwaukee Brewers.

Magruder was drafted out of the University of Washington, where he played college baseball for the Huskies from 1996–1998, by the San Francisco Giants. Magruder elected free agency following the  season, in lieu of an outright assignment to the Brewer's top minor league baseball affiliate, the Triple-A Nashville Sounds. He had served in a backup role as a reserve for the starting outfielders Carlos Lee, Geoff Jenkins, and Brady Clark.

Perhaps the single most significant moment of his career was his debut with the Indians. His first at bat as a member of the Tribe was a double off the wall in the 8th inning to break up a no-hit bid.

Former National Football League quarterback Jon Kitna is Magruder's first cousin.

References

External links
MLB.com Player Profile

1977 births
Living people
Cleveland Indians players
Major League Baseball outfielders
Baseball players from Washington (state)
Milwaukee Brewers players
Texas Rangers players
Mahoning Valley Scrappers players
Fresno Grizzlies players
Oklahoma RedHawks players
Akron Aeros players
Buffalo Bisons (minor league) players
Shreveport Captains players
Indianapolis Indians players
Washington Huskies baseball players
Salem-Keizer Volcanoes players
Bakersfield Blaze players
Shreveport Swamp Dragons players